The Chiesa di San Moisè (or San Moisè Profeta) is a Baroque style, Roman Catholic church in Venice, northern Italy.

History
The church was built initially in the 8th century. It is dedicated to Moses since like the Byzantines, the Venetians often considered Old Testament prophets as canonized saints. It also honors Moisè Venier, the aristocrat who funded the reconstruction during the 9th century.

San Moisè is the parish church of one of the parishes in the Vicariate of San Marco-Castello. The other churches within the parish are Santa Maria Zobenigo, San Fantin, Santa Croce degli Armeni and the Basilica of San Marco itself.

Exterior
The elaborate Baroque facade, dating from 1668, is profusely decorated with sculpture. Some of its sculptures are generally attributed to German artist  Heinrich Meyring. The architectural design attributed to Alessandro Tremignon, with patronage by Vincenzo Fini, whose bust is found over the entry door. Statues in public spaces were forbidden in Venice, thus by putting his bust on the facade of a church, he could circumvent this ordinance and display his wealth and his recent addition to the Libro d'Oro or Venetian aristocracy.

Interior
The interior is dominated by Meyring's huge and mannerist sculptural set piece and altarpiece, depiction Moses at Mount Sinai receiving the Tablets, created by Tremignon and Meyring. Behind it is a canvas painted by Michelangelo Morlaiter. It also has a Washing of the Feet by Tintoretto, and a Last Supper by Palma il Giovane. The altarpiece of the Deposition (1636) was painted by Niccolò Roccatagliata in collaboration with Sebastiano.

John Law, originator of the Mississippi Scheme, is buried in the church.

References

Sources
 Extracted from Italian Wikipedia.

Roman Catholic churches in Venice
9th-century churches in Italy
17th-century Roman Catholic church buildings in Italy